Kuch Gunjoan Ki Shaan Mein is a 2000 book by British author Mahmud Khan, written in Urdu. The title literally means "In Praise of Baldness". It was written to address a perceived absence of humour in books written in Urdu, available in the United Kingdom.

References

External links
 Official Website

2000 books
Urdu-language literature